Nisiotika (meaning "insular (songs)") are the songs and dances of Greek islands with a variety of styles, played by ethnic Greeks in Greece, Turkey, Australia, the United States and elsewhere.

The lyre is the dominant folk instrument along with the laouto, violin, tsampouna and souravli with widely varying Greek characteristics.

Representative musicians and performers of Nisiotika include: Mariza Koch, credited with reviving the field in the 1970s, Yiannis Parios, Domna Samiou and the Konitopoulos family (Giorgos and Vangelis Konitopoulos, Eirini, Nasia and Stella Konitopoulou).

There are also prominent elements of Cretan music on the Dodecanese Islands and Cyclades.

Notable artists

Composers:
Giorgos Konitopoulos
Vangelis Konitopoulos
Stathis Koukoularis 
Yiannis Parios 
Nikos Ikonomidis 
Stamatis Hatzopoulos

Singers:
Glykeria
Vagelis konitopoulos 
Stella Konitopoulou
Yiannis Parios
Domna Samiou
Mariza Koch
Nasia Konitopoulou

Folk dances

The Aegean Islands have a rich folk dance tradition. For example; syrtos, sousta and ballos. 
Ballos 
Ikariotikos 
Kamara 
Kalymnikos
Karavas of Naxos
Lerikos of Leros 
Mihanikos 
Parianos
Pentozalis
Pirgousikos of Chios
Pidikhtos
Rhoditikos
Sousta (Sousta Lerou, Sousta Tilou)
Syrtos (Syrtos Kythnou, Syrtos Serifou, Syrtos Naxou)
Trata

See also
Greek folk music
Greek dances
Cretan music
Greek musical instruments

External links
Musipedia: Νησιώτικα

Greek dances
Greek words and phrases